The sixth season of the American television series The Masked Singer premiered on Fox on September 22, 2021, following a sneak peek episode that aired on September 12, and concluded on December 15, 2021. The season was won by singer Jewel as "Queen of Hearts", with singer Todrick Hall finishing second as "Bull".

Panelists and host 

Nick Cannon, singer-songwriter Robin Thicke, television and radio personality Jenny McCarthy Wahlberg, actor and comedian Ken Jeong, and recording artist Nicole Scherzinger all returned as host and panelists. The panelists also again competed for the Golden Ear during the season, with Nicole Scherzinger winning for the first time.

Guest panelists in the season included Leslie Jordan in the sixth episode, Joel McHale in the seventh episode, will.i.am in the eighth episode, and Cheryl Hines in the ninth episode.

Production 
On May 17, 2021, it was announced that Fox renewed the series for a sixth season, prior to the airing of the fifth season's finale on May 26. On July 26, 2021, it was announced that the season would premiere with a two-night premiere on September 22 and 23.

Filming for the season began at the end of June 2021, with an expected wrap date of August 11. During production, it was reported that 12 positive cases of COVID-19 were confirmed at Red Studios Hollywood, though filming was not halted. Also aided by the availability of COVID-19 vaccines, this season features a studio audience for the first time since season three (the last season filmed prior to the start of the pandemic), though with a smaller size than it used to be.

A new twist called the 'Take It Off Buzzer' was introduced in this season. The button can be used once for each group. If a panelist pushes it and guesses the celebrity correctly, then the contestant must take off their mask and be eliminated and the panelist will get two extra points towards their Golden Ear score. If the guess is incorrect, then the contestant keeps their mask on and stays in the competition. Ken Jeong pushed the button for Group A and incorrectly guessed that "Pepper" was Sara Bareilles, while Jenny McCarthy Wahlberg pushed the button for Group B and incorrectly guessed that "Caterpillar" was Jake Gyllenhaal.

Contestants 
The season features two groups, Group A and Group B. For the first time in the show's history, the winner of each group will face-off against each other in the season finale episode. Wild cards, a concept introduced in the previous season, also return, being added to each group throughout the season to compete for the "Golden Mask" trophy themselves. The contestants in this season are reported to have a combined 85 Grammy nominations, 27 Grammy wins, 12 Emmy nominations, 12 Razzie Award nominations, three Academy Award nominations, two Super Bowl appearances, and two lifetime achievement awards.

"Baby" is the first human costume featured on the show.

(WC) This masked singer is a wild card contestant.

Episodes

Week 1 (September 22 and 23)

Week 2 (September 29)

Week 3 (October 6)

Week 4 (October 13)

Week 5 (October 20)
Guest panelist performance: "This Little Light of Mine" performed by Leslie Jordan as "Soft Serve"

Week 6 (November 3)

Week 7 (November 10)

Week 8 (November 17)

Week 9 (December 1)

Week 10 (December 8)

Week 11 (December 15) – Finale

Ratings

Notes

References

2021 American television seasons
The Masked Singer (American TV series)